The Abandoned is a 2022 Taiwanese crime film directed and co-written by Tseng Ying-ting.

Premise

Cast
 Janine Chang as Wu Jie
 Ethan Juan as Lin You-sheng
 Sajee Apiwong 
 Hsueh Shih-ling as Lin's friend
 Chen Wei-min as Sheriff

Release
The film was screened in the London East Asia Film Festival (LEAFF)'s Competition section on October 22, 2022, followed by its Taiwanese premiere at the Taipei Golden Horse Film Festival on November 5th.

Awards and nominations

References

External links

 

2022 films
2022 crime films
Taiwanese crime films
2020s Mandarin-language films
Thai-language films